The following lists events that happened during 1883 in New Zealand.

Incumbents

Regal and viceregal
Head of State – Queen Victoria
Governor – Lieutenant-General Sir William Jervois begins his term on 20 January.

Government and law
The 8th New Zealand Parliament continues.

Speaker of the House – Maurice O'Rorke.
Premier – Frederick Whitaker is replaced by Harry Atkinson on 25 September
Minister of Finance – Harry Atkinson
Chief Justice – Hon Sir James Prendergast

Main centre leaders
Mayor of Auckland – James Clark followed by William Waddel
Mayor of Christchurch – George Ruddenklau
Mayor of Dunedin – James Bryce Thomson followed by William Parker Street
Mayor of Wellington – George Fisher

Events 
 1 March – A telephone exchange is opened in Wellington (the fourth in New Zealand).  
The Hokitika Guardian and Hokitika Evening Star merge to form the Hokitika Guardian and Star.
September: The Waikato Mail ceases publication. The Cambridge newspaper started in 1880.
 19 February: Pacifist leaders Te Whiti o Rongomai and To hu are released from prison, where they had been held without trial since November 1881.
 July: The Waikato Gazette & Thames Valley Recorder begins publishing. It was absorbed by the Cambridge News in 1889.
 the New Zealand Shipping Company was formed in Christchurch.

Sport

Cricket
 1882–83 New Zealand cricket season
 1883–84 New Zealand cricket season

Horse racing
The New Zealand Cup is so-named, the race having been run under another name since 1865.

New Zealand Cup winner: Tasman
New Zealand Derby winner: Oudeis
Auckland Cup winner: Salvage
Wellington Cup winner: Mischief

see also :Category:Horse races in New Zealand.

Rugby
The Auckland Rugby Union is formed.

Provincial club rugby champions include: 
see also :Category:Rugby union in New Zealand

Shooting
Ballinger Belt: Sergeant Kennedy (Dunedin)

Births
 14 May – Charlie Seeling (died 1956), rugby (league and union) footballer.
 31 October – Anthony Wilding (died 1915), tennis player

Full date unknown
Ngapipi Reweti, land negotiator (died 1957)

Deaths 
 30 March: Edward Graham McMinn, politician.
 30 June: William Cutten, politician.

See also
List of years in New Zealand
Timeline of New Zealand history
History of New Zealand
Military history of New Zealand
Timeline of the New Zealand environment
Timeline of New Zealand's links with Antarctica

References
General
 Romanos, J. (2001) New Zealand Sporting Records and Lists. Auckland: Hodder Moa Beckett. 
Specific

External links